The Zhengzhou–Shaolinsi Expressway, often referred to as Zhengshao Expressway and designated as S85 in Henan's expressway system, is  long regional expressway in Henan, China.The Zhengzhou–Shaolinsi (Shaolin Monastery in Dengfeng) expressway was opened in 28 December 2003. On 12 February 2018, it was announced that the expressway would be free of charge to light passenger vehicles registered in Zhengzhou (the initial characters on licence plates are 豫A) from 22 February 2018. After 1 May 2018, this policy is only applicable to eligible vehicles equipped with ETC devices.

Exits list

References

Expressways in Henan
Transport in Henan
Expressways in Zhengzhou